Injanah Air Base is a former Iraqi Air Force base in the Diyala Governorate of Iraq. It was captured by U.S.-led Coalition forces during Operation Iraqi Freedom in 2003.

Overview
The facility was an auxiliary airfield, consisting of a 10,000 foot runway and a small aircraft parking ramp. It was abandoned after March 2003.

The runway has been subjected to excavations by Coalition personnel and thus made unserviceable. The facility is now abandoned and being reclaimed by the desert.

References

Iraqi Air Force bases